Bian Jinyang (born 16 September 1993 in Heilongjiang, China) is a Chinese author.

In 2003, Bian Jinyang, then 9 years old, published his first books 《时光魔琴》and 《秦人部落》under the pen name Yang Yang. Many Chinese readers described his books as comparable to J. K. Rowling's Harry Potter series.

References
"Interview of Bian Jinyang on chinabaike.com"

Writers from Heilongjiang
Child writers
Living people
1993 births
Chinese male novelists
People's Republic of China novelists
21st-century Chinese novelists
21st-century male writers